The Port of Haydarpaşa, also known as the Port of Haidar Pasha or the Port of Istanbul, is a general cargo seaport, ro-ro and container terminal, situated in Haydarpaşa, Istanbul, Turkey at the southern entrance to the Bosphorus, near Haydarpaşa Station. It is operated by the Turkish State Railways (TCDD) and serves a hinterland which includes the country's most industrialised areas.

It is the largest port in Istanbul  and the second biggest in the Marmara Region, after Ambarlı. With an annual cargo volume exceeding six million metric tons (MT), it is Turkey's fourth-biggest port after Mersin, Ambarli and Izmir.

History
The Anatolian Railway began construction of the port on April 20, 1899, and operated the port until the newly established Turkish Republic purchased it on May 24, 1924. On May 31, 1927, the port's administration was handed over to the Turkish State Railways (TCDD).

On February 5, 1953, an extension for the Port of Haydarpaşa was started. The first part was completed in 1954 and the remainder in 1967.

Port facilities

The Port has 21 berths alongside two large piers. The berths are specialized for particular port industries, with  one for motor boat servicing at 150 m in length, two for dry bulk cargo (430 m long), 8 large-size berths for general cargo (between 160 and 334 m), 3 mid-size general cargo berths (between 50 and 97 m), two ro-ro terminals (141 and 164 m) and, finally, 5 container terminals (between 295 and 350 m). The depth of water at the quays varies between 5 and 10 m. The vessels in the port are protected by two breakwaters from all kinds of effects caused by the weather and sea.

Sea crafts of the port comprise 3 tugboats up to 2500 HP and 2 mooring watercraft.

Container terminal

Total container handling capacity of the five container terminals is 1,700 vessels a year. Operations are carried out by 4 quayside gantry cranes of 40 tons' capacity, 18 rubber-tired gantry cranes (40 tons' capacity), 9 reach stackers (25 to 42 tons) and 8 empty container forklifts (8 to 10 tons). Nine shore and yard cranes (3 to 35 tons), 6 mobile cranes (5 to 25 tons), 8 standard and 30 small-masted forklifts are also available. Another facility available at the terminal is the provision of reefer facilities for refrigerated containers.

A container freight station of 3,600 m² is available behind the container quay. In addition to the open storage area of 313,000 m² and covered area of 21,000 m², there exists a container land terminal outside the port in Göztepe for stacking the empty containers. It covers an area of 55,000 m² with a holding capacity of TEU.

Container loading and unloading, and custom clearance are made in the terminal at the port.

Ro-ro terminal
The  ro-ro terminal can accommodate 360 vessels per year, and handle 410,000 tons of cargo, 65,000 trucks and 60,000 cars a year. There is a bi-weekly ro-pax cargo and passenger ferry service between the ports Haydarpaşa and Chornomorsk, Ukraine. .

General cargo handling equipment
At the port, 1,134 general cargo ships can be serviced a year. The floating crafts comprise one floating crane of 250 tons' capacity, 17 shore and yard cranes (3 to 35 tons), 17 mobile cranes (5 to 25 tons), 67 general cargo forklifts (2 to 5 tons), one loader, 6 tractors, 25 trailers (40 tons), 10 trailers (20 tons) and two weigh-bridges of 100 tons' capacity.

Bulk handling facilities
Two berths serve the dry bulk traffic of up to 79 vessels a year. A grain silo of 34,000 tons' capacity belonging to the Turkish Grain Board (TMO) is available and has a conveyor connection with the quay.

Rail ferry terminal

The rail ferry terminal and ferries are operated between Sirkeci and Haydarpaşa, the two sides of Bosphorus. Each of the three rail ferries with 480 tons capacity can transfer 14 rail carriages.

Port navigation
Pilotage is compulsory for berthing, unberthing and anchoring, a service provided round the clock by the Turkish Maritime Administration (TDİ). Pilots meet vessels west of a line passing through the light on the breakwater of Kumkapı Fishing Boat Harbour on the European side of Sea of Marmara.

Towage is not necessary for vessels up to 1500 gt. A mooring boat is compulsory and arranged by pilot. The service is provided by the Port Authority round the clock.

Future project
The port and its surroundings have been the subject of plans for redevelopment since around 2006 but in 2022 it was still operating as a city-centre container port.

See also
 Baghdad Railway
 Haydarpaşa Terminal
 Marmaray

References

External links

Buildings and structures in Istanbul
Turkish State Railways
Ports and harbours of the Sea of Marmara
1899 establishments in the Ottoman Empire
Container terminals
Transport in Kadıköy
Transport in Istanbul